The Oregon Common School Fund is part of the budget of the U.S. state of Oregon. It derives from the use of state lands dedicated to public schools. The Oregon State Land Board, composed according to the Oregon Constitution of the Governor, Secretary of State, and Treasurer of Oregon, has responsibility for managing the fund.

, the fund's principal was valued at $1,169,000,000. Since 2000, annual disbursements have varied from as low as $13.3 million (in 2004) to $48.5 million (in 2007).

See also 
 Land-grant university

References 

Public finance in Oregon
Education in Oregon